Berrytown is an unincorporated community in Bradford County, Pennsylvania, United States. It is part of Northeastern Pennsylvania.

References

Unincorporated communities in Bradford County, Pennsylvania
Unincorporated communities in Pennsylvania